Gunita is a 1940 Filipino film directed by Manuel Silos and starring Miguel Anzures, Narding Anzures and Dely Atay-atayan.

External links
 

1940 films
Philippine drama films
Tagalog-language films
Sampaguita Pictures films
Philippine black-and-white films